Four More Shots Please! is an Indian  comedy-drama streaming television series on Amazon Prime Video directed by Anu Menon and Nupur Asthana. The series follows the story of four unapologetically flawed women (two in their 30s and two in their early 20s) as they live, love, make mistakes and discover what really makes them tick through friendship and shots of tequila in millennial Mumbai. The series is Amazon Prime Video's first all-women-protagonists Indian original starring Sayani Gupta, Bani J, Kirti Kulhari, and Maanvi Gagroo. Reviewers have referred to the show as a "desi version of Sex and The City." The first season was one of top three most-watched Amazon Original Series from India in 2019, and season two was called "the most-watched Indian show on the platform" in May 2020. Shortly after season two was released, Amazon announced that season three was in the works. Season 3 premiered on October 21, 2022.

Cast

Main
Sayani Gupta as Damini Rizvi Roy "Dee", an investigative journalist.
Bani J as Umang Singh "Mangs", a gym trainer.
Kirti Kulhari as Anjana Menon "Anj" Khanna, a lawyer and divorced mother.
Maanvi Gagroo as Sidhi Patel "Sids", a single child from a wealthy family.

Recurring
Lisa Ray as Samara Kapoor
Milind Soman as Dr. Aamir Warsi 
Jiya Lakhiani as Arya Menon Khanna
Neil Bhoopalam as Varun Khanna
Prateik Babbar as Jeh Wadia 
Ankur Rathee as Arjun Nair
Paras Tomar as Mohit Mehta
Simone Singh as Sneha Patel 
Amrita Puri as Kavya Arora
Sapna Pabbi as Akanksha Moitra
Rajeev Siddhartha as Mihir Shah "Mihu Pihu"
Sameer Kochhar as Shashank Bose
Prabal Panjabi as Amit Mishra
Shibani Dandekar as Sushmita Sengupta
Padma Damodaran as Aparna Sahukar
Monica Dogra as Devyani Rana (cameo)
Anuradha Chandan as Amina Rizvi Roy
Madhu Anand Chandhock as Mrs. Singh 
Mohit Chauhan as Mahesh Roy
Nimisha Mehta as Myra
Gaurav Sharma as Vinil Verma
Jim Sarbh as Sean Lobo
Sushant Singh as Rajan
Rohan Vinod Mehra as Dhananjay Deshpande
Shilpa Shukla as Meher
Akshay Bindra as Dhruv

Episodes

Series overview

Season 1 (2019)
</onlyinclude>

Season 2 (2020)
Amazon Prime announced the second season of the web series in June 2019 with Nupur Asthana replacing Anu Menon as director. It is undoubtedly Amazon Prime India's first successful women-led franchise in the over-the-top (OTT) space. Four More Shots Please! season 2 was released on 17 April 2020.

Awards and nominations

References

External links 

Amazon Prime Video original programming
2019 Indian television series debuts
Indian LGBT-related web series
Television shows set in Mumbai
Bisexuality-related television series
2010s LGBT-related television series